Pontania proxima, the willow gall sawfly, is native to Europe and Western Asia and makes prominent red galls on the leaves of willows (Salix species). It is also now widespread in New Zealand, after arriving in Canterbury in 1929, and was successfully introduced to Australia.

References

Sawflies
Taxa named by Amédée Louis Michel le Peletier